Keith Ellison (born February 6, 1984) is a former American football linebacker. He was drafted by the Buffalo Bills in the sixth round of the 2006 NFL Draft. He played college football at Oregon State.

Early years
Ellison attended Redondo Union High School in Redondo Beach, California and was a student and a standout in football and basketball. In football, he played quarterback, linebacker and safety, and as a senior, he was named the Bay League's Defensive Player of the Year and was an All-California Interscholastic Federation selection. In basketball, he was a four-year letterman and starter. Keith Ellison graduated from Redondo Union High School in 2002.

College career
He played 2 years of college football at Oregon State University, one year at El Camino College and 2 years at San Diego State University, and was drafted in the 6th round of the 2006 NFL Draft as the 178th overall pick.

Professional career
Keith Ellison is currently a Physical Education Teacher for the 7th and 8th grade at Adams Middle School, Redondo Beach California.

Buffalo Bills
Ellison started his first NFL game in week two of the 2006 season, replacing the injured Takeo Spikes. Ellison went on to start 7 games for the Bills in 2006, filling in for both Takeo Spikes and Angelo Crowell because of injuries they suffered throughout the year. Ellison, standing at 6'0" 228 pounds, recorded 65 total tackles (33 solo), 1 sack, 1 interception, and 1 fumble recovery in 2006, his rookie campaign.

Ellison has spent the 2007 season as the starting weakside linebacker for the Bills. In his first three years at Buffalo he has recorded a total of 177 tackles, 2 interceptions, and 2 sacks.

A restricted free agent in the 2009 offseason, Ellison signed a one-year, $1.01 million contract with the Bills on March 25.

The Buffalo Bills announced March 4, 2010 that it has tendered a contract offer to restricted free agent linebacker Keith Ellison, a sixth-round pick in 2006. The tender is worth $1,176,000.

On November 27, 2010, Ellison was placed on injured reserve by the Bills. For the season with the Bills, Ellison played in eight games (starting two) and totaled 20 tackles.

Teaching career
Sometime after, Ellison became a teacher at Adams Middle School. He mainly teaches history and physical education.

Personal
Ellison is the older brother of safety Kevin Ellison, who was drafted out of the University of Southern California in the 2009 NFL Draft; like his older brother, the younger Ellison was selected around the same time: in the 6th round, 189th overall, by the San Diego Chargers.

Another brother, Chris, played for BYU in 1997 and 1998.

References

External links
Buffalo Bills bio
Oregon State Beavers bio

1984 births
Living people
Players of American football from Los Angeles
American football linebackers
Oregon State Beavers football players
Buffalo Bills players
Sportspeople from Redondo Beach, California